Cambrian Academy is a private school in San Jose, California, founded in 2008 by Dave Delgado.

Private College Preparatory School 
Cambrian Academy serves students in Grades 6-12. Although described as an Advanced Middle School and College Preparatory High School, it is organized as a continuum spanning Grades 6-12. Students are placed in classes based on ability rather than age, so the grade-level distinction is less important than the individual student's path to college.

International School 
The international school at Cambrian Academy, also known as Cambrian International Academy (CIA), enrolls foreign students from 6th through 12th grade. CIA's stated objective for foreign students is to quickly develop their English language skills so they can be mainstreamed into the academy's general student population. This prevents foreign students from becoming isolated, as happens too often in many ESL programs.

Accreditation 
The school is accredited by the Accrediting Commission of the Western Association of Schools and Colleges.

References 

High schools in San Jose, California
Private high schools in California
Private middle schools in California
Educational institutions established in 2008
2008 establishments in California
Private schools in San Jose, California